The 2010 Guelph municipal election were held on October 25, 2010 in Guelph, Ontario, Canada, to elect the Mayor of Guelph, Guelph City Council and the Guelph members of the Upper Grand District School Board (Public) and Wellington Catholic District School Board. The election was held in conjunction with the provincewide 2010 municipal elections.

Election results
Names in bold denotes elected candidates. 
(X) denotes incumbent.

Mayor 
One candidate to be elected.

Councillors
Two candidates per ward to be elected.

Ward 1

Ward 2

Ward 3

Ward 4

Ward 5

Ward 6

Upper Grand District School Board

Wards 1 & 5
Two candidates to be elected.

Wards 2,3 & 4
Two candidates to be elected.

Ward 6 and Puslinch
One candidate to be elected.

Wellington Catholic District School Board
Four candidates to be elected.

Conseil Scolaire Public de District du Centre-Sud Ouest
One candidate to be elected, representing Waterloo Region, Middlesex County, Wellington County, Perth County and Huron County.

Conseil Scolaire de District Catholiques Centre-Sud
One candidate to be elected, representing Brampton, Caledon, Dufferin County and Wellington County.

References

2010 Ontario municipal elections
2010